Roger Louis Pelé (29 August 1901 – 30 March 1982) was a French long-distance runner. He competed in the men's 5000 metres at the 1928 Summer Olympics.

References

1901 births
1982 deaths
Athletes (track and field) at the 1928 Summer Olympics
French male long-distance runners
Olympic athletes of France
Place of birth missing